Babadag, a Turkish word (baba: "father, great"; dağ: "mountain"), may refer to:

Populated places

Turkey
 Babadağ, Denizli, a town in Denizli province
 Babadağ, Muğla, a town in Muğla Province

Romania
 Babadag, a town in the Tulcea county

Mountains

Azerbaijan
 Babadağ (Azerbaijan)

Turkey
 [Babadağ (mountain, Muğla)], in the Fethiye district, Muğla, ancient Mount Anticragus
 Babadağ (mountain, Denizli), in the Denizli province, also named Karcı Dağı